TMD may refer to:

Arts and entertainment
 Team Deathmatch, in gaming
 Telemundo, an American Spanish-language television network
 The Medic Droid, a band
 "Truly Madly Deeply" (song), by Savage Garden

Military
 Texas Military Department
 Theater missile defense, American initiative

Science
 Temporomandibular joint dysfunction, a jaw condition
 Transmembrane domain, part of proteins
 Transition metal dichalcogenide monolayers, thin semiconductor material
 Transverse momentum distributions, in particle physics experiments

Technology
 Thorn Microwave Devices, a brand of Thorn Electrical Industries
 Tip-magnetic driving
 Tuned mass damper

Other uses
 Traction maintenance depot
 Trade Marks Directive
 Tottenham Mandem, an organized street gang based in London, UK